Olaf Paltian (born 21 September 1952) is a German former cyclist. He competed in the team time trial event at the 1976 Summer Olympics.

References

External links
 

1952 births
Living people
German male cyclists
Olympic cyclists of West Germany
Cyclists at the 1976 Summer Olympics
Cyclists from Berlin